"Back to the World" is a song by American R&B singer Tevin Campbell. It was written by Jamey Jaz, Rahsaan Patterson, and Mikelyn Roderick for his third album of the same name (1996). The song became a top ten hit in New Zealand, peaking at number eight on the New Zealand Singles Chart, and entered the top 40 in Australia. In the US, "Back to the World" was the only single from its parent album to garner decent success on the charts, peaking at number 16 on the Hot R&B/Hip-Hop Songs chart.

Music video
A music video for "Back to the World" was directed by Bille Woodruff.

Track listings

Notes
 denotes additional producer

Credits and personnel
Credits lifted from the liner notes of Back to the World.

Tevin Campbell – executive producer, vocals
Lua Crofts – background vocalist
Jamey Jaz – background vocalist, producer, writer

Rahsaan Patterson – background vocalist, writer
Michael Stradford – executive producer
Mikelyn Roderick – background vocalist, writer

Charts

Weekly charts

Year-end charts

References

Tevin Campbell songs
1996 singles
1996 songs
Songs written by Rahsaan Patterson
Contemporary R&B ballads
1990s ballads